Heinz Dürr is a German entrepreneur and a major shareholder in the Stuttgart-based engineering firm Dürr AG, founded by his grandfather in 1895. Dürr was born in Stuttgart on 16 July 1933 and, aged 12, attended the National-Political Institute of Learning in Rottweil in 1944–45. He completed his secondary school education in post-war West Germany in 1953.

Dürr was chairman of the board of AEG from 1980 to 1990, and from 1991 he served as executive board chairman of Deutsche Bundesbahn and Deutsche Reichsbahn, Germany's state-owned railways. When these enterprises were combined and privatized in 1994, Dürr became the first chairman of the board of the new Deutsche Bahn AG, a position he held until 1997. He is credited with the invention of the weekend discount ticket (Schönes- Wochenende-Ticket), which led to a notable increase in local railway traffic in Germany.

References

External links 
Atlantic Times interview with Heinz Dürr

Living people
1933 births
Commanders Crosses of the Order of Merit of the Federal Republic of Germany
Recipients of the Order of Merit of Berlin